Michael John Tilleman (March 30, 1944 – September 18, 2020) was an American professional football player who was a defensive tackle in the National Football League (NFL) for 11 seasons (1966–76). He played college football for the Montana Grizzlies.

Biography

Early life
Tilleman was born and raised on a ranch near Zurich, Montana by Henry (Hank) and Irma Tilleman (née D'Hooge), where he went to school in a one-room schoolhouse. He was a prep star at Chinook High School and attended the University of Montana on scholarship.

Playing career
Tilleman played for the Grizzlies from 1963 to 1964, where he was a second-team All-Big Sky Conference selection in both seasons.  After graduating from UM, he bypassed his senior season to sign with the Minnesota Vikings who had selected him with the 163rd pick of the 1965 NFL Draft.  He was drafted in earlier rounds by the Kansas City Chiefs but opted for the Vikings because the NFL was a stronger league than the AFL.

He played for four different NFL teams during his pro career: two years for the Minnesota Vikings, he was drafted in the expansion draft by the New Orleans Saints and hence an original Saint, two years for the Houston Oilers bought out his option with the Oilers and was traded for a first-round draft choice by the Atlanta Falcons to get him to Atlanta.  He finished his pro career in Atlanta.  An offensive lineman once commented that he would rather catch javelins for an hour than to take head slaps from Mike Tilleman.

Personal life
Mike and his wife Gloria lived in Havre, Montana, where they ran Tilleman Motor Company, a local General Motors dealership. They had three grown children, Suzanne, Christopher and Craig, the latter of whom runs the car dealership.

Mike Tilleman hosted a celebrity pheasant hunt, called "Legends for Lights", where former NFL players went to Havre every Fall and all money raised was donated to the Northern Lights Athletic Foundation for the MSU-Northern athletic program, providing scholarships and paying for one full-time coaching position.

Tilleman died on September 18, 2020, aged 76.

References

External links
College Football Data Warehouse  – Montana Grizzlies results 1960–1964
Pro-Football-Reference.com – career NFL stats

1944 births
2020 deaths
People from Chinook, Montana
American football defensive tackles
Montana Grizzlies football players
Minnesota Vikings players
New Orleans Saints players
Houston Oilers players
Atlanta Falcons players
Players of American football from Montana
People from Havre, Montana
Businesspeople from Montana